The 5K run is a long-distance road running competition over a distance of . Also referred to as the 5K road race, 5 km, or simply 5K, it is the shortest of the most common road running distances. It is usually distinguished from the 5000 metres  track running event by stating the distance in kilometres, rather than metres.

Among road running events, the 5K distance is mostly popular with novice or infrequent runners or joggers, as it is comparatively easier to complete the distance without endurance training. The 5K distance also makes the distance suitable for people looking to improve or maintain their general physical fitness, rather than develop long-distance running abilities. The brevity of the distance means that less time is required to take part in the activity and that people from a wide range of ages and abilities may participate. From a physiological perspective, five kilometres is towards the low end of endurance running.

The combination of the activity's simplicity, its low cost, and medium exercise intensity mean that it is often recommended by medical organisations and healthcare professionals. Like all physical activity, regular 5K runs can improve cardiovascular function and reduce body fat, as well as having mental health benefits (see runner's high).

Events
Similar to other road running events, many organised 5K running events incorporate an element of charity running. Runners may elect to raise money for a chosen charity on the condition of their completion of the race. Raising money for charity is typically optional, with other participants running for pleasure. The 5K distance is particularly popular among women and a number of annual women-only races are organised over the 5K distance. Running USA's 2012 analysis of participation in American road races showed that 58% of participants in 5K races were women. The race participation contrasts with women's participation in sport in general and in longer distance races particularly, where the same report showed the gender bias was reversed.

The Hot Chocolate 5K in Chicago and the Mercedes-Benz Corporate Run in Miami are the largest organised 5K runs in the United States, having attracted over 20,000 and over 16,000 runners, respectively, in 2012. The number of runners ranked the Hot Chocolate 5K as the 20th largest road running event of any distance in the United States that year. There are several prominent 5K race series, including The Color Run, an international, mass participation, city-based series involving coloured water showers, and the parkrun series, which is a worldwide network of free-to-enter, volunteer-led races occurring each weekend, originating in the United Kingdom.

Unlike longer road races, such as the 10K run and marathon, the 5K distance is not commonly contested by elite distance runners. The Carlsbad 5000 is one of the few races that attract competitive elite fields and has seen several world bests for the distance (prior to the IAAF's 2018 decision to begin recognising world records for the 5K).  The IAAF, now World Athletics did not go back to recognise the world best performances set at Carlsbad, which left a dilemma of known superior performances at Carlsbad and inferior world records that will last until the performances at Carlsbad are recognised or surpassed.

Another annual American race, Freihofer's Run for Women, also regularly has elite women competing in the road distance, as does the BOClassic in Italy. Elite racing almost exclusively takes place on the track for this distance.

There is no official world championship event organised for the 5 km road distance. Championships over 5 km are held nationally in some areas, including the United States and England. An annual North American 5K Championships was created in 2002, but the competition ceased after 2005.

Records

The 5 km road distance was introduced by IAAF as a world record event in November 2017, with the inaugural record to be recognised after 1 January 2018 if the performances were equal to or better than 13:10 for men and 14:45 for women. Other statistical organisations, including the Association of Road Racing Statisticians, record best times for the event. Records for the 5K are often noted in national records in athletics.

All-time top 25
+ = en route to longer performance

Men
Correct as of February 2023.

Notes
Below is a list of other times equal or superior to 13:17:
Berihu Aregawi also ran 12:52 (2021).
Joshua Cheptegei also ran 13:13 (2021), 13:16 (2022).

Women
Correct as of December 2022.

Notes
Below is a list of other times equal or superior to 14:48:
Ejgayehu Taye also ran 14:21  (2022).
Senbere Teferi also ran 14:37 (2022).
Yalemzerf Yehualaw also ran 14:44  (2022), 14:47 (2023).
Norah Jeruto also ran 14:46 (2019) and 14:48 (2021).
Eilish McColgan also ran 14:48  (2022).

Notes

References

List of world bests
World Best Progressions- Road. Association of Road Racing Statisticians (2013-12-21). Retrieved on 2014-01-18.

External links
5K run training from About.com

Road running distances
Long-distance running distances